Bermejo (meaning "russet" or "auburn" in Spanish) may refer to:

Geographic Locations 
Bermejo Department, Chaco, Argentina
Bermejo Department, Formosa, Argentina
Bermejo Pass, an alternate name for Uspallata Pass, Argentina
Bermejo River, a tributary of the Paraguay River, South America
Bermejo, Tarija Department, Bolivia
Bermejo Airport
Concepción del Bermejo, Chaco, Argentina
Isla Bermejo, Argentina
Puerto Bermejo, Chaco, Argentina

Persons 
Álex Bermejo (born 1998), Spanish football player
Alvaro Bermejo (born 1959), Spanish writer and journalist
Bartolomé Bermejo (c. 1440 - c. 1498), Spanish artist
Francisco Javier Bermejo (born 1955), Spanish football player
Guillermo Bermejo (born 1975), Peruvian politician
Javier Bermejo (born 1978), Spanish athlete
Jesús Ángel Solana Bermejo (born 1964), Spanish footballer and coach
José Bermejo López (1894–1971), Spanish military officer and colonial administrator
Juan José Arévalo Bermejo (1904–1990), President of Guatemala
Lee Bermejo, American illustrator
Luis Bermejo, (1931–2015), Spanish illustrator
Magdalena Bermejo (born c. 1962), Spanish primatologist 
Manuel Bermejo Hernández (1936–2009), Spanish politician
Mariano Fernández Bermejo (born 1948), Spanish jurist and politician
Mario Bermejo (born 1978), Spanish footballer
Ricardo Bermejo (1900–1957), Chilean cyclist
Segismundo Bermejo y Merelo (1832–1899), Spanish Minister of the Navy
Sergio Bermejo (born 1997), Spanish football player